Patrick Murphy may refer to:

Politicians 
 Patrick Charles Murphy (1868–1925), Canadian Senator
 Patrick Murphy (Irish politician) (1889–1968), Irish Fianna Fáil politician from Cork
 Patrick Murphy (Pennsylvania politician) (born 1973), Under Secretary of the Army and Acting Secretary of the Army
 Patrick O. Murphy (born 1982), American politician in Massachusetts
 Patrick Murphy (Florida politician) (born 1983), U.S. Representative from Florida
 Patrick Francis Murphy (1860–1931), legislator in Massachusetts

Sportsmen 
 Pat Murphy (rugby union) (c. 1878 – c. 1945), Australian rugby player
 P. A. Murphy (1919–1973), Irish Gaelic football player
 Patrick Murphy (cyclist) (born 1933), Canadian Olympic cyclist
 Patrick Murphy (judoka) (born 1944), Irish Olympic judoka
 Patrick Murphy (softball) (born 1965), American softball coach
 Patrick Murphy (swimmer) (born 1984), Australian Olympic swimmer
 Patrick Murphy (baseball) (born 1995), American baseball player
 Patrick "Weeshie" Murphy (died 1973), Gaelic footballer
 Patrick Murphy (cricketer) (1882–1938), Irish cricketer

Others 
 Patrick Murphy (bishop) (1920–2007), Australian Roman Catholic bishop, first bishop of Broken Bay
 Patrick Murphy (giant) (1834–1862), Irish giant
 Patrick Murphy (Medal of Honor) (1823–1896), American Civil War sailor and Medal of Honor recipient
 G. Patrick Murphy (born 1948), U.S. federal judge
 W. Patrick Murphy, U.S. diplomat
 Patrick Henry Murphy (born 1961), member of the Texas Seven, prison escapee 2000–2001
 Patrick V. Murphy (1920–2011), New York City Police Commissioner
 Patrick Murphy (pilot), Irish pilot who bombed Naco, Arizona in 1929
 Patrick Murphy (producer) (active since 1981), American television producer
 Patrick Murphy (artist) (born 1969), British artist and designer
 Patrick Murphy (The Young and the Restless), character on the American soap opera The Young and the Restless

See also
 Pat Murphy (disambiguation)